Rowan Claire Milburn (born 18 June 1977) is a New Zealand former cricketer who played as a wicket-keeper and right-handed batter. She appeared in 7 One Day Internationals for the Netherlands in 2000, and 8 One Day Internationals and 2 Twenty20 Internationals for New Zealand in 2007. She played domestic cricket for Otago and Canterbury in New Zealand.

While playing in the Dutch domestic competition, she was selected to play for the Netherlands in the 2000 World Cup in New Zealand. She made the team's only fifty of the tournament when she scored 71 against Ireland.

She became a schoolteacher. She was Assistant Principal of Mountainview High School in Timaru, and as of 2022 she is Principal of Hagley College in Christchurch.

She is the daughter of former New Zealand Test cricketer Barry Milburn, who was also a wicket-keeper.

References

External links
 

1977 births
Living people
People from Mosgiel
Dutch women cricketers
New Zealand women cricketers
Dual international cricketers
New Zealand women One Day International cricketers
New Zealand women Twenty20 International cricketers
Netherlands women One Day International cricketers
Canterbury Magicians cricketers
Otago Sparks cricketers
New Zealand schoolteachers
Wicket-keepers